Brémontier-Merval is a commune in the Seine-Maritime department in the Normandy region in northern France.

Geography

Population

Places of interest
 The church of St.Martin, dating from the sixteenth century.
 The seventeenth-century château de Brémontier-Merval.
 The château de Bellosanne, built in 1827 on the old abbey site.
 The thirteenth-century chapel of St.Léonard at Merval.
 The eighteenth-century chapel of St.Marguerite at Bellosanne.

See also
Communes of the Seine-Maritime department

References

Communes of Seine-Maritime